The South Province is one of three administrative subdivisions in New Caledonia. It corresponds to the southern and southwestern portion of the New Caledonian mainland.

Overview

It is by far the most economically developed and most urbanized part of the archipelago and indeed in the entire Melanesian region. The South Province is also the only part of New Caledonia - and Melanesia - where ethnic Melanesians do not constitute an absolute majority of the population.

The provincial assembly and executive are in Nouméa. The administrative services of the French state, however, are located in La Foa, with a Deputy Commissioner of the Republic (commissaire délégué de la République), akin to a subprefect of metropolitan France, in residence there. La Foa was chosen by the French central State in the late 1980s to counterbalance the overwhelming weight of Nouméa in New Caledonia

The central State administrative services in La Foa are not to be confused with the central State administrative services in Nouméa. The former manage local matters at the provincial level, whereas the latter, with the High Commissioner of the Republic in New Caledonia at their head, manage territorial matters for the whole of New Caledonia.

Provincial Assembly
Of the 40 seats in the provincial assembly, the Rally-UMP holds 15, the Caledonia Together has 12, the Future Together has 5, the Kanak and Socialist National Liberation Front has 4, the Movement for Diversity has 2, the Union for a Caledonian Destiny has 1 and there is 1 miscellaneous right (ex-Rally for Caledonia).

Notable people
 Ilaïsaane Lauouvéa - former assembly member

See also
Politics of New Caledonia

References

Provinces of New Caledonia
Geography of New Caledonia